The ISO 3166-1 alpha-2 code "CS" may refer to:
Czechoslovakia (until 1993)
Serbia and Montenegro (from 2003 to 2006)